SolarStriker is a vertically scrolling shooter video game developed by Nintendo and Minakuchi Engineering and published by Nintendo for the Game Boy. It was first published in Japan on January 26, 1990, then released later in North America on February 2, 1990, and finally in Europe on September 28, 1990.

Plot
"The year is 2159.  The Earth Federal Government was established, linking the people with a common government against other species. As part of this new addition and to defend the human race's peace and safety, the Earth Federal Army was also created."

"The army went on the offensive, and attacked a star known as 'Turin.' However, the Earth Federal Army was no match for the overwhelming combat power of Turin, and Earth's fate seemed sealed. As Earth's last chance, a top-secret mobile unit developed a very advanced space fighter in Earth's last fortification. Flying with the mothership, 'Mother Atena', it arrived at Turin's solar system as the last chance for a violent and final attack on the Turin forces. This advanced spacecraft, and Earth's last hope for survival, is code-named 'Solar Striker'."

Gameplay

The player controls the advanced space fighter, code-named Solar Striker. There are six levels of play against enemies known as the forces of Reticulon. These enemies appear from the top of the screen. The player can amass power-ups by shooting special ships. One power-up doubles the player's firepower, three power-ups triples the player's firepower, and five power-ups causes shots to explode on impact with enemies, greatly aiding combat against tough enemies and bosses that take many hits to destroy. There are a variety of enemies as well as sub-bosses in later levels. When the player completes all six levels for the first time and after the credits roll, the player will be able to play Hard Mode by pressing Select instead of Start from the title screen.

Development
Solar Striker was designed by Gunpei Yokoi and Keisuke Terasaki, and developed by Nintendo in co-operation with the external company Minakuchi Engineering. It was first published in Japan on January 26, 1990, then released later in North America in February, and finally in Europe on September 28. As such, it is one of the few scrolling shooters developed by Nintendo.

Reception
Solar Striker has been met with generally favorable reviews. It earned an overall score of 75% at GameRankings. Mean Machines described Solar Striker as "adequate", but noted there was a lack of material to keep players interested, giving the game a score of 69%. Allgame rated it 2.5/5, describing it as a "decent shooter but nothing great", and citing its difficulty as a deterrent to enjoying it. Games Are Fun gave it a 7 out of 10. German magazine Power Play praised the title for its variety in terms of enemies and levels, though noted the underlying simplicity of the game as well, giving it a score of 70%.

Author Jeff Rovin in the book How to Win at Game Boy Games described the title as "one of the oldest kinds of Nintendo games", comparing it to SNK's Alpha Mission but added there were too few instances of innovation or surprises, and the powerups were "unsatisfying".

Legacy
The background music for Level 1 and Level 2 was used in the beginning of the Captain N: The Game Master episode, "The Trouble With Tetris", in a slightly altered form. A space craft seen in the same part of the episode resembles the Solar Striker on the Japanese box art of the game. The Level 1 background music was also used in later season 2 episodes of Captain N: The Game Master.

Notes

References

External links
Official Japanese website (Translated using Excite.Co.Jp)
Official Japanese instructions in PDF format

Solar Striker at NinDB

1990 video games
Game Boy games
Game Boy-only games
Nintendo Research & Development 1 games
Science fiction video games
Shoot 'em ups
Single-player video games
Vertically scrolling shooters
Video games developed in Japan
Video games directed by Satoru Okada
Video games produced by Gunpei Yokoi
Video games set in the 22nd century